Mobile Suit Gundam Unicorn is an anime OVA series by Sunrise, adapted from the novel of the same title by Harutoshi Fukui.  The plot revolves around Banagher Links, a seemingly normal schoolboy living in the space colony Industrial 7.  His life changes one day when he meets a mysterious girl named Audrey Burne, as the encounter brings him into contact with a new Gundam and its connections to an item called "Laplace's Box". 

In the June 2009 issue of the Japanese monthly manga magazine Gundam Ace, it was announced that an anime adaptation of Gundam Unicorn was green-lit for late 2009 and later moved to spring 2010.  It is directed by Kazuhiro Furuhashi and features screenplays written by Yasuyuki Muto. Hajime Katoki, who was the mechanical designer for the novel, works on the anime alongside veteran designers Junya Ishigaki and Mika Akitaka, and newcomer Nobuhiko Genba.  Yoshikazu Yasuhiko's character designs were adapted for the series by Kumiko Takahashi, and the music is composed by Hiroyuki Sawano.  It was planned to be six 50-minute episodes with a worldwide release.  However, on May 13, 2012, Bandai announced that the storyline will wrap up with a seventh episode.  The series premiered on PlayStation Network Japan for PlayStation 3 and PlayStation Portable systems on February 20, 2010.  The Blu-ray Disc edition was released simultaneously worldwide on March 12, 2010, featuring both Japanese and English audio and subtitles in five languages (Japanese, English, French, Spanish and Chinese).  Bandai Entertainment released the first four episodes of Unicorn on DVD before shutting down in 2012.  Sunrise released the OVA series on DVD in North America in four volumes with distribution from Right Stuf Inc. beginning in August 2013. The OVA ran from February 20, 2010, to June 6, 2014.

A television rebroadcast series of the anime titled Mobile Suit Gundam Unicorn RE:0096 was announced by Sunrise on February 21, 2016, and began airing on April 3, 2016, in Japan on TV Asahi and other networks, replacing Brave Beats.  This is the first Gundam series to air on TV Asahi since After War Gundam X which ended in 1996.  The rebroadcast features new animated footage and next episode previews narrated by Shuichi Ikeda as his Full Frontal character, as well as a new opening and two new ending themes all composed by Hiroyuki Sawano under his alias, "SawanoHiroyuki[nZk]", the first opening theme titled "Into the Sky" is performed by SawanoHiroyuki[nZk]:Tielle, the first ending theme titled "Next 2U -eUC-" is performed by SawanoHiroyuki[nZk]:naNami and the second ending theme titled "bL∞dy f8 -eUC-" is performed by SawanoHiroyuki[nZk]:Aimer. On November 29, 2016, it was announced that the English dub of RE:0096 would make its television broadcast premiere on Adult Swim's Toonami programming block on January 8, 2017, and ended on June 11, 2017.

Episode List

Mobile Suit Gundam Unicorn episodes

Mobile Suit Gundam Unicorn RE:0096 Episodes

Notes

References

Mobile Suit Gundam Unicorn